Cephalocassis manillensis is a species of catfish in the family Ariidae. It was described by Achille Valenciennes in 1840, originally under the genus Pimelodus. It occurs in the low reaches of large freshwater rivers, in the Philippines.

References

Ariidae
Taxa named by Achille Valenciennes 
Fish described in 1840